Events from the year 1767 in Sweden

Incumbents
 Monarch – Adolf Frederick

Events

 - All spinning for both household needs as well as for selling is freely permitted in all Sweden. 
 - Tankar i anledning af Sista Öfwerflöds-Förordningen Och Dess wärkställighet; Fattade i pennan, och Dedicerade til MALCONTENTERNE, Af En Fri Svensk, by Françoise Marguerite Janiçon

Births

 January - Catharina Ulrika Hjort af Ornäs, murder victim   (died 1837) 
 16 January - Anders Gustaf Ekeberg, chemist who discovered tantalum in 1802   (died 1813) 
 1 February – Ulrika Melin, textile artist   (died 1834) 
 
 
 
 10 December - Conrad Quensel, naturalist   (died 1806) 
 10 December - Fredrik Gyllenborg,  Prime Minister of Sweden   (died 1829)

Deaths

 
 
 9 May - Jean Fredman, role model of the Songs of Fredman (born 1712)
 
 Lisbetta Isacsdotter, religious leader  (born 1733)

References

 
Years of the 18th century in Sweden
Sweden